Phragmataecia anikini is a species of moth of the family Cossidae. It is found in south-western Mongolia (Hovd aimak, Dzhungarian Gobi desert).

References

Moths described in 2011
Phragmataecia